Major (R) Khurram Gulzar IGP (PSP) is a former Pakistani Army and Police officer. He belongs to the 45th Pakistan Military Academy Long Course.
Inducted into the Police Services of Pakistan as a Superintendent of Police (SP) in 1989.(11th CTP).

References

1949 births
Living people